The Danish Arabia expedition was a Danish scientific expedition to Egypt, Arabia and Syria. Its principal goal was to elucidate the Old Testament with additional research goals concerned with natural history, geography and cartography. It had six members, of whom only Carsten Niebuhr survived, returning to Denmark in 1767. The journey has been chronicled by the 20th century novelist, Thorkild Hansen, in his novel Arabia Felix.

Members 
Six people went on the expedition, and five died. † denotes which members died on the expedition.

 Peter Forsskål†: Finnish/Swedish natural scientist and student of Carl Linnaeus; his main tasks was to find supporting evidence for a number of Linnaeus' accounts.
 Frederik Christian von Haven†: Philologist, was tasked to purchase oriental manuscripts and to transcribe inscriptions. Furthermore, to make observations on the Arabic language, with a focus to help on the obscure passages of the Old Testament.
 Carsten Niebuhr: Cartographer, was to observe and take measurements for mapping.
 Christian Carl Kramer†: Physician, was to research medical questions, both on the scientific and also on a more practical level, among the people of Arabia.
 Georg Wilhelm Baurenfeind†: Artist and painter, tasked to sketch the finds of the others.
 Lars Berggren†: Acted as orderly on the trip.

Expedition

The expedition departed from Copenhagen on 4 January 1761, landing at Alexandria and ascending the Nile. Proceeding to Suez, Niebuhr visited Mount Sinai, and then in October 1762 the expedition sailed to Jeddah and then journeyed overland to Mocha. Here, in May 1763, von Haven died, and shortly afterwards Forsskål died. The remaining members of the expedition visited Sanaa, the capital of Yemen, but suffered from the climate and returned to Mocha. Niebuhr seems to have preserved his own life and restored his health by adopting native dress and eating native food. 

From Mocha, the expedition continued to Bombay; both Baurenfeind and Berggren died en route, and Kramer died soon after landing. Niebuhr was the only surviving member. He stayed in Bombay for fourteen months and then returned home by way of Muscat, Bushire, Shiraz and Persepolis. His copies of the cuneiform inscriptions at Persepolis proved to be a key turning point in the decipherment of cuneiform and the birth of Assyriology. He also visited the ruins of Babylon (making many important sketches),  Baghdad, Mosul and Aleppo.  He likely visited the Behistun Inscription around 1764.  After a visit to Cyprus he made a tour through Palestine, crossed the Taurus Mountains to Bursa, reached Constantinople in February 1767, and finally arrived in Copenhagen the following November.

References

Further reading 

 Hansen, Anne Haslund, Niebuhr's Museum, "Artefacts and Souvenirs from the Royal Danish Expedition to Arabia 1761-1767," Copenhagen 2016.

External links
 The Arabian Journey 1761-1767
 Article (in Danish)
 Lost In Arabia by Colin Thubron, New York Review of Books

Asian expeditions
1761 in Denmark
Exploration of Western Asia
History of the Middle East
African expeditions
Expeditions from Denmark

da:Carsten Niebuhr#Den store arabiske Ekspedition 1761-67